In heraldry, orange is a tincture, rarely used other than in Catalan, South African, French municipal and American military heraldry. As a colour, Orange should be used against metals in order not to contravene the rule of tincture. Orange is distinct not only from Gules (red), but also from Tenné (or Tanné), which originated as the light-brownish colour of tanned leather, and from Carnation, used for the depiction of white human skin.

Orange was not allocated a pattern in the system of hatching developed in the early 17th century, but later received one in the form of a series of vertical lines of dots and dashes (a hybrid of the vertical lines used to represent Gules, and the dots used to represent Or).

The orange colour used in heraldry should be rich and deep enough to be clearly distinguished from both metals, Argent (white) and Or (yellow), and from Gules (red), Tenné (light brown) and Carnation (flesh-colour).

Gallery

References

External links

 Heraldic tinctures
 Armoria - Tinctures

Colours (heraldry)
Shades of orange